Daud Bisinle is a Somali politician. He was the Minister of Petroleum and Mineral Resources of Puntland from 2009 until 2019, having been appointed to the position by former Puntland president Abdirahman Farole. Prior to that he served as Minister of Planning. Bisinle has also acted as a spokesman for Farole, including voicing opposition to support for the TFG, the Transitional Federal Government.

References

Living people
Government ministers of Somalia
Year of birth missing (living people)